John Weir Murray (October 6, 1913 – March 20, 1996) also known as Jack Murray, was an American pastor, evangelist, and educator.

Personal life

Murray was born in Laurium, Michigan, and grew up in Bellingham, Washington. He studied at the Bible Institute of Los Angeles, Wheaton College in Illinois, and Faith Theological Seminary.

Murray served as a pastor until 1955, when he became president of Shelton College. He led the establishment of the Harvey Cedars Bible Conference in 1941, with the purchase of the historic Harvey Cedars Hotel. In 1960, he left Shelton to start a radio evangelism ministry, Bible Evangelism Inc.  Murray co-founded Clearwater Christian College during the early 1960s. In 1971, along with Allan MacRae, Murray founded Biblical Theological Seminary.

References

1913 births
1996 deaths
People from Laurium, Michigan
Biola University alumni
Wheaton College (Illinois) alumni
Faith Theological Seminary alumni
American evangelists
Radio evangelists
University and college founders
Heads of universities and colleges in the United States
People from Bellingham, Washington
20th-century American academics